Otar Kakabadze (born 27 June 1995) is a Georgian professional footballer who plays as a right-back for Polish club Cracovia and the Georgia national team.

Club career

Dinamo Tbilisi
Born in Tbilisi, Kakabadze was a FC Dinamo Tbilisi youth graduate. He made his debut with the reserves on 27 November 2012, starting in a 2–0 away win against FC Racha Ambrolauri, and scored his first senior goal in a 6–0 home routing of FC Kakheti Telavi on 19 October 2013.

Kakabadze was promoted to the main squad in 2014. He made his professional debut on 16 September of that year, coming on as a second-half substitute for Irakli Dzaria in a 6–0 home thrashing of FC Shukura Kobuleti.

Kakabadze quickly established himself as a starter at Dinamo, and scored his first professional goal on 23 October 2015, netting the winner in a 2–1 home success over FC Tskhinvali.

Gimnàstic
On 7 July 2016, Kakabadze signed a three-year deal with Spanish Segunda División side Gimnàstic de Tarragona.

On 4 January 2017, it was confirmed, that Kakabadze had signed a loan-deal with Danish Superliga club Esbjerg fB for the rest of the season. Upon returning, he became a regular starter for Nàstic.

FC Luzern
On 30 August 2018, Kakabadze was transferred to Swiss side FC Luzern.

Tenerife
On 25 September 2020, Kakabadze returned to Spain and its second division after agreeing to a contract with CD Tenerife.

International career
After representing Georgia at under-17, under-19 and under-21 levels, Kakabadze made his debut for the full squad on 8 October 2015, starting in a 4–0 home win against Gibraltar for the UEFA Euro 2016 qualifiers.

Honours
Dinamo Tbilisi
Umaglesi Liga: 2013–14, 2015–16
Georgian Cup: 2013–14, 2014–15, 2015–16
Georgian Super Cup: 2014, 2015

References

External links

1995 births
Living people
Footballers from Tbilisi
Footballers from Georgia (country)
Association football defenders
FC Dinamo Tbilisi players
Segunda División players
Gimnàstic de Tarragona footballers
CD Tenerife players
Swiss Super League players
FC Luzern players
Ekstraklasa players
III liga players
MKS Cracovia (football) players
Georgia (country) under-21 international footballers
Georgia (country) international footballers
Expatriate footballers from Georgia (country)
Expatriate sportspeople from Georgia (country) in Spain
Expatriate sportspeople from Georgia (country) in Switzerland
Expatriate footballers in Spain
Expatriate footballers in Switzerland
Expatriate footballers in Poland
Esbjerg fB players
Georgia (country) youth international footballers